The Boston and New York Air-Line Railroad (commonly known simply as The Air Line, known as the New Haven, Middletown and Willimantic Railroad before 1875) was a railroad in Connecticut. Envisioned as a direct route between New Haven and Boston, it was hampered by difficult terrain in eastern Connecticut and did not find much success. The New York, New Haven and Hartford Railroad leased the company in 1882. The tracks between Portland, Connecticut and Willimantic, Connecticut were abandoned in 1965, while the remainder of the line is operated by the Providence and Worcester Railroad.

History 

The first attempt to build an air-line railroad connecting New Haven and Boston began in 1846, with the chartering of the New York and Boston Railroad Company. The railroad began building from New Haven in 1853, but construction quickly stalled and the company failed during the Panic of 1857.

In 1867, a group of investors decided to try again, chartering the New Haven, Middletown and Willimantic Railroad Company. Starting from New Haven, service to Middletown commenced in 1870, while construction between Middletown and Willimantic was completed in 1873. Debt from construction brought the railroad into bankruptcy in 1875; it emerged under the new name Boston and New York Air-Line Railroad.

The Air-Line Railroad was leased by the rapidly growing New York, New Haven and Hartford Railroad in 1882.

See also 
 Air Line State Park Trail

References 

Companies affiliated with the New York, New Haven and Hartford Railroad
Defunct Connecticut railroads
New York and New England Railroad